Chris Elder (born 1992) is a rugby union player for Yorkshire Carnegie having played for London Welsh and formerly for England under 18s, Wasps, Esher and Plymouth Albion.

References

1992 births
Living people
English rugby union players
Leeds Tykes players
London Welsh RFC players
Wasps RFC players
Esher RFC players
Plymouth Albion R.F.C. players
Rugby union fullbacks